Coomera is an electoral district of the Legislative Assembly in the Australian state of Queensland, based at the northern end of the Gold Coast. The seat has been held by the Liberal National Party since its establishment in 2009.

Geography
A coastal suburban electorate, Coomera lies entirely east of the Pacific Motorway. It includes the City of Gold Coast suburbs of Hope Island, Jacobs Well, Steiglitz and parts of Coomera, Ormeau and Pimpama. It also includes the Logan City suburb of Eagleby.

History
A new district created for the 2009 state election to accommodate the Gold Coast's urban growth, Coomera was in large part drawn from the eastern half of the district of Albert, which was significantly reduced in size. The southern end of Coomera also includes parts previously belonging to the districts of Broadwater and Gaven. Its inaugural member is Michael Crandon of the Liberal National Party.

Members for Coomera

Election results

References

External links
 Electorate profile (Antony Green, ABC)

Coomera
Gold Coast, Queensland